The Erris Rams were an American football team based in Erris, and latterly Castlebar, Ireland. The team was founded by Michael Kelly in October 2008, becoming the first and only American football team in the province of Connacht.

It competed in the IAFL Development League in 2009, where it finished with a 2-6 record, having lost its starting quarterback Andrew Kelly due to injury in the second game of the season. The team's two victories came against the Midlands Soldiers. Having relocated to Castlebar for the 2010 season, the team folded after just one match, a 46-0 loss to the Dublin Rebels.

Records

2009 season

References

American football teams in the Republic of Ireland
2008 establishments in Ireland
American football teams established in 2008
2010 disestablishments in Ireland
American football teams disestablished in 2010